"Accession" is the 89th episode of the syndicated American science fiction television series Star Trek: Deep Space Nine, the 17th episode of the fourth season.

Set in the 24th century, the series follows the adventures on Deep Space Nine, a space station located near a stable wormhole between the Alpha and Gamma quadrants of the Milky Way Galaxy. The wormhole is the home of powerful non-corporeal beings, known as the "Prophets", who are worshiped by the natives of the nearby planet Bajor as gods; the Bajorans consider Benjamin Sisko (Avery Brooks), the human commanding officer of the space station, to be the Prophets' chosen "Emissary". In this episode, Sisko is given a much-appreciated opportunity to relinquish the title of Emissary, but soon comes to regret it.

A subplot in this episode involves Keiko O'Brien's return to the station after a research expedition to Bajor and her husband Miles re-adapting to life with her after her extended absence.

Plot
An archaic Bajoran spaceship emerges from the wormhole. Its passenger, Akorem Laan, is a revered Bajoran poet who disappeared 200 years ago. Akorem claims to have been chosen by the Prophets as their Emissary—a role thought to belong to Captain Sisko. Sisko, who never felt comfortable being the Bajorans' messiah figure, cedes the title without resistance.

Akorem believes the Prophets brought him back to restore Bajor's traditional caste system, which was abandoned during the 50-year Cardassian occupation of Bajor. Porta, a Bajoran priest who supports Akorem, tells Major Kira that she must resign her military commission and become an artist, which was her family's traditional profession under the caste system. Sisko warns Akorem that caste-based discrimination is banned by the Federation and thus would disqualify Bajor from Federation membership, but Akorem is adamant.

Sisko has a dream where Kai Opaka, a former spiritual leader of Bajor, tells him that he has lost sight of who he is. Doctor Bashir believes that Sisko has experienced an "orb shadow", a type of hallucination that Bajorans believe are reminders from the Prophets to people who ignore the Prophets' will.

Porta murders a fellow priest whose caste is considered spiritually unclean. Sisko realizes that Akorem's influence will be bad for Bajor's future and challenges him for the role of Emissary. They decide that the only way to settle the matter is to go to the wormhole and ask the Prophets themselves what they want. The Prophets tell them that Sisko is in fact their Emissary and "of Bajor", and that they brought Akorem to the present for Sisko's benefit. Akorem is sent back to his own era with no memory of what happened to him in the future.

Sisko is once again recognized as the Emissary by the Bajorans. This time, he accepts the role happily, now that he appreciates the positive influence he has on the Bajorans. Major Kira notices that Akorem's famously incomplete epic poem The Call of the Prophets now exists in its entirety, suggesting that Akorem was able to complete his masterwork after returning to the past.

In a side plot, Keiko O'Brien and her daughter Molly return from a research trip to Bajor; Miles is glad to have his family back on the station, but he misses the free time he had to spend with his friend Bashir.

Production 
Akorem's spacecraft is represented by computer-generated imagery produced by Industrial Light & Magic. They also did a similar spacecraft in the episode "Explorers".

Reception 
In 2018, SyFy recommended this episode for its abbreviated watch guide for the character Kira Nerys. They praised this episode for not only having a "beautiful scene" but also establishing how much Kira values her job on the space station, and her relationships there.

In 2020, Io9 said this was one of the "must watch" episodes from the series.

See also

 "Disaster" - the fifth season episode of Star Trek: The Next Generation where, as mentioned, Lt. Commander Worf is forced to deliver the O'Briens' first baby, Molly, in the Enterprises Ten-Forward lounge.

References

External links

 

Star Trek: Deep Space Nine (season 4) episodes
1996 American television episodes
Star Trek time travel episodes
Television episodes written by Jane Espenson
Television episodes directed by Les Landau